The 2017 Brisbane Broncos season is the 30th in the club's history. Coached by Wayne Bennett, and captained by Darius Boyd, they compete in the NRL's 2017 Telstra Premiership. Prior to the start of the Premiership season, the Broncos competed in the 2017 NRL Auckland Nines, finishing first in their pool, but lost the Quarter-Final.

Squad

Movements

Gains

Losses

Ladder

Fixtures

Pre-season

NRL Auckland Nines 

The NRL Auckland Nines is a pre-season rugby league nines competition featuring all 16 NRL clubs. The 2017 competition was played over two days on 4 and 5 February at Eden Park. The Broncos featured in the Rangitoto pool and played the Knights, Tigers and Storm.

Finals

World Club Series

Regular season

Finals

Statistics

Representatives

State of Origin 

 Darius Boyd - Queensland
 Corey Oates - Queensland
 Anthony Milford - Queensland
 Matt Gillett - Queensland
 Josh McGuire - Queensland
 Ben Hunt - Queensland
 Sam Thaiday - Queensland

ANZAC Test 

 Darius Boyd - Australia
 Matt Gillett - Australia
 Sam Thaiday - Australia
 Adam Blair - New Zealand
 Kodi Nikorima - New Zealand
 Jordan Kahu - New Zealand

World Cup 

 Korbin Sims - Fiji
 Ben Hunt - Australia
 Matt Gillett - Australia
 Josh McGuire - Australia
 Kodi Nikorima - New Zealand
 Adam Blair - New Zealand
 Herman Ese'ese - Samoa
 Joe Ofahengaue - Tonga
 Tevita Pangai Junior - Tonga
 David Mead - Papua New Guinea

Judiciary

See also 
2017 NRL season

References 

Brisbane Broncos seasons
Brisbane Broncos season